The Jersey Bridge is a one-lane, Pratt through truss bridge that spans Oil Creek in Cherrytree Township, Venango County in the U.S. state of Pennsylvania. It connects the city of Titusville to the Drake Well Museum and Oil Creek State Park. The bridge was listed on the National Register of Historic Places in 1988. It was replaced in 1998 with a newer bridge that used the superstructure of the old bridge.

History 
The Jersey Bridge was constructed in 1882 by the Morse Bridge Company, the predecessor to Youngstown Bridge Company. The Pennsylvania Department of Transportation (PennDOT) instituted a  weight limit for the bridge due to its deteriorating condition in 1979. It was listed on the National Register of Historic Places on June 22, 1988. The bridge was replaced in 1997 to meet safety requirements from PennDOT, as well as to allow tour buses heading to the nearby Drake Well Museum. The replacement of the bridge, on the only route to and from museum, forced the museum to close on November 2, 1997. The museum was able to reopen in April 1998 after an agreement with the Oil Creek and Titusville Railroad, which operates a train station at the museum, to transport tourists from Titusville to Drake Well. The refurbished Jersey Bridge was reopened on May 27, 1998.

Design 
After it was rebuilt in 1998, the refurbished Jersey Bridge utilized the original bridge's superstructure, though the actual loadbearing substructure is a common girder bridge. The superstructure remained a pin-connected, Pratt through truss bridge. The bridge is still one-lane, but has a pedestrian walkway on one side of the bridge outside the superstructure.

See also 

 List of bridges on the National Register of Historic Places in Pennsylvania
 National Register of Historic Places listings in Venango County, Pennsylvania

References 

Bridges completed in 1882
Road bridges on the National Register of Historic Places in Pennsylvania
Bridges in Venango County, Pennsylvania
Steel bridges in the United States
National Register of Historic Places in Venango County, Pennsylvania
Girder bridges in the United States
Pratt truss bridges in the United States